Attavante degli Attavanti (or Vante; 1452–1525) was an Italian painter.

An imitator of Bartolomeo della Gatta, he was employed by Matthias Corvinus, King of Hungary, for whom he executed a missal, now in the Royal Library at Brussels. There is another breviary by him in the National Library at Paris, executed in the manner of Domenico Ghirlandaio. Other missals in Florence and Rome are also ascribed to him. Attavante, who was a miniature painter of great merit, worked at Florence towards the close of the 15th century.

His workshop also produced the Jerome's Bible - one of the finest bibles ever to be produced in the Italian renaissance, now in the Portuguese national archives, Torre do Tombo.

An illuminated Book of Hours on vellum, attributed to Attavanti or to his "circle", was stolen from a London warehouse in January 2017, on its way to a book fair in the United States.

Gallery

References

 

1452 births
1525 deaths
People from Castelfiorentino
15th-century Italian painters
Italian male painters
16th-century Italian painters
Manuscript illuminators